Greed is the second album by Ambitious Lovers, released in 1988 through Virgin Records.

Track listing

Personnel 
Ambitious Lovers
Arto Lindsay – vocals, guitar
Peter Scherer – keyboards, synthesizer bass, drum programming, sampling, production
Additional musicians
Joey Baron – drums on "Steel Wool" and "Para Não Contrariar Voce"
D.K. Dyson – backing vocals
Bill Frisell – guitar on "Steel Wool" and "Para Não Contrariar Voce"
Gail Lou – backing vocals
Vernon Reid – guitar on "Copy Me", "Privacy" and "Love Overlap"
Naná Vasconcelos – percussion, vocals on "Copy Me" and "It Only Has to Happen Once"
John Zorn – saxophone on "Privacy" and "Admit It"
Production
Knut Bohn – additional recording
Ed Brooks – assistant engineering
John Cicchitti – assistant engineering
Vitor Farias – additional recording
Keith Freedman – assistant engineering, additional recording
Oz Fritz – assistant engineering
Eric Hurtig – additional recording
Bob Ludwig – mastering
Francis Manzella – additional recording
Roger Moutenot – assistant engineering, mixing, recording
UE Nastasi – assistant engineering
Paula Zanes – art direction, photography
Dary Sulich – assistant engineering

References

External links 
 

1988 albums
Ambitious Lovers albums
Virgin Records albums